Allium diabolense, common name serpentine onion or devil's onion is a species of wild onion endemic to central California, where it is known from the Coast Ranges and the Transverse Ranges. It grows on serpentine soils at elevations from 500 to 1500 m, from Kern and Ventura Counties north to Stanislaus and Santa Clara Counties.

"Allium diabolense" grows from a reddish-brown bulb just over a centimeter long. It produces a stem up to 20 centimeters tall and one leaf which is longer than the stem. The inflorescence contains up to 50 dark veined pink-tinted white flowers. Anthers and pollen are yellow.

References

External links
USDA Plants Profile
Photo gallery

diabolense
Flora of California
Onions
Flora without expected TNC conservation status